The geography of the North Cascades describes a range of rugged mountains in British Columbia, Canada and Washington, United States. In Canada, the range is officially named the Cascade Mountains but is commonly referred to as the Canadian Cascades.

Extent
The Fraser River and Similkameen River in British Columbia form the northern boundary of the North Cascades. On the east, the Okanogan River and the Columbia River bound the range. On the west within the United States, the foothills of the range are separated by a narrow coastal plain from Puget Sound, whereas in Canada there are few if any foothills and the range drops steeply to the floodplain of the Fraser Lowland.

The southern boundary of the North Cascades is less definite. For the purposes of this article, it will be taken as US Highway 2, running over Stevens Pass, or equivalently, the Skykomish River, Nason Creek, and the lower Wenatchee River. This roughly follows Beckey's division. Sometimes the southern boundary is defined by Snoqualmie Pass and the approximate route of Interstate 90.

Subranges

There are various formally named subranges, and some informally named ones.  Formally named subranges include the:
Okanagan Range
Hozameen Range
Bedded Range
Skagit Range
Cheam Range ("Four Brothers")
Picket Range
Informally named ranges include the Coquihalla Range, which lies between the Coquihalla River and the Fraser Canyon south of an imaginary line roughly connecting Coquihalla Pass with the town of Boston Bar.  The Coquihalla Range includes a group of horn-like summits known as the Anderson River Group, also known as the Llamoid Group due to conferred names such as Vicuna Peak, Yak Peak, Guanaco Peak, etc.

Protected areas

The North Cascades include various protected areas. 
Chief among the areas in Washington is North Cascades National Park, occupying much of the area between Mount Baker and the Cascade divide. Contiguous with the Park are 
Ross Lake National Recreation Area and Lake Chelan National Recreation Area.
Designated wilderness areas in the range include: 
Mount Baker Wilderness 
Glacier Peak Wilderness
Boulder River Wilderness
Henry M. Jackson Wilderness, 
Lake Chelan-Sawtooth Wilderness
Noisy-Diobsud Wilderness
Pasayten Wilderness
Stephen Mather Wilderness
Wild Sky Wilderness

In British Columbia, protected areas include
Skagit Valley Provincial Park
E.C. Manning Provincial Park
Cascade Recreation Area
Cathedral Provincial Park
Coquihalla Canyon Provincial Park

Notable peaks
The following North Cascades peaks are notable for their height (absolute elevation):
 

The following peaks are notable for their topographic prominence:

The following peaks are notable for their large, steep rise above local terrain. Peaks are listed in descending order by elevation.

Highest waterfalls

The North Cascades are known for having many extremely tall glacial-fed waterfalls; the ten highest measured waterfalls are listed.

Many tall waterfalls occur where meltwater from mountain glaciers drop down a headwall, which are common occurrences in the North Cascades. Many waterfalls, despite their great height, are non-notable as they are not clearly visible and often have low volume. A few notable exceptions do occur; Sulphide Creek Falls occurs where meltwaters from two of the largest Mount Shuksan glaciers are forced through a narrow chute over a  headwall at the head of Sulphide Valley.

Features
Geographical features in the area of the North Cascades National Park can be found in this image map:

References

North Cascades
Geography of British Columbia
Geography of Washington (state)